St. Emma Plantation is a  former sugar plantation and house in Ascension Parish, Louisiana, United States.

The plantation was the scene of a Civil War skirmish in the fall of 1862. The Greek Revival plantation house was owned by Charles A. Kock, a prominent sugar planter and slaveholder, between 1854 and 1869.

The house was listed on National Register of Historic Places in 1980.

See also
National Register of Historic Places listings in Ascension Parish, Louisiana

References

External links
 Saint Emma Plantation National Park Service

Houses on the National Register of Historic Places in Louisiana
Greek Revival houses in Louisiana
Houses completed in 1850
Houses in Ascension Parish, Louisiana
Donaldsonville, Louisiana
National Register of Historic Places in Ascension Parish, Louisiana